William Eugene "Gene" Wilson (May 5, 1929 – July 31, 2015) was a Republican member of the North Carolina General Assembly representing the state's 93rd House district, including constituents in Ashe and Watauga counties. A retiree and restaurateur from Boone, North Carolina, Wilson served seven terms in the House of Representatives. He was defeated for re-election in November 2006 by Democrat Cullie Tarleton.

Electoral history

2006

2004

2002

2000

References

|-

|-

|-

Democratic Party members of the North Carolina House of Representatives
1929 births
2015 deaths
21st-century American politicians